Band (also known as Darband) is a village in Baranduz Rural District of the Central District of Urmia County, West Azerbaijan province, Iran. At the 2006 National Census, its population was 3,888 in 872 households. The following census in 2011 counted 4,092 people in 1,081 households. The latest census in 2016 showed a population of 4,769 people in 1,281 households; it was the largest village in its rural district.

References 

Urmia County

Populated places in West Azerbaijan Province

Populated places in Urmia County